George John William Jakeman (19 May 1903 – 1973) was an English footballer who played in the Football League for Aston Villa and Notts County.

References

1903 births
1973 deaths
English footballers
Association football defenders
English Football League players
Aston Villa F.C. players
Notts County F.C. players
Kidderminster Harriers F.C. players
Cradley Heath F.C. players